The Germania Turnverein Building, also known as the Commercial Printing Company, is an historic commercial building which is located in Lancaster, Lancaster County, Pennsylvania.

It was added to the National Register of Historic Places in 1980.

History and architectural features
Built between 1897 and 1898, the Germania Turnverein Building is a four-story, four-bay-by-five-bay brick building that was designed in a Late Victorian style. It was built as a speculative commercial building by Philip Lebzelter (1829-1906); among its tenants were the Germania Turnverein.

It was added to the National Register of Historic Places in 1980.

References

Commercial buildings on the National Register of Historic Places in Pennsylvania
Commercial buildings completed in 1898
Buildings and structures in Lancaster, Pennsylvania
1898 establishments in Pennsylvania
National Register of Historic Places in Lancaster, Pennsylvania